Joseph Wengier (born 1954) is an Israeli paralympic swimming champion. He competed at the 1972, 1976, 1980, and 1984, and 1988 Summer Paralympics.

Life 
Wengier was born in 1954 and contracted polio when he was one year old. At the age of six he joined the Israel Sports Center for the Disabled.

Throughout his sports career he won 23 medals at the Paralympic Games and set 16 world records.

Wengier works as a translator since 1972 and opened his own company Officeservice in 1988. He has a B.Sc. in biology from Tel Aviv University.

Wengier is a founding member of Etgarim organization for promotion of disabled sports. He was also chairman of the swimming committee within the Israel Sports Association for the Disabled.

References 

1954 births
Living people
Israeli male swimmers
Paralympic swimmers of Israel
Swimmers at the 1972 Summer Paralympics
Swimmers at the 1976 Summer Paralympics
Swimmers at the 1980 Summer Paralympics
Swimmers at the 1984 Summer Paralympics
Swimmers at the 1988 Summer Paralympics
Paralympic gold medalists for Israel
Paralympic silver medalists for Israel
Paralympic bronze medalists for Israel
Medalists at the 1972 Summer Paralympics
Medalists at the 1976 Summer Paralympics
Medalists at the 1980 Summer Paralympics
Medalists at the 1984 Summer Paralympics
Medalists at the 1988 Summer Paralympics
Paralympic medalists in swimming